Biomega is a Copenhagen-based, Danish  brand of designer bicycles. It is known for engaging international designers from outside the bicycle industry—including Marc Newson, Ross Lovegrove and  Karim Rashid— in designing its products. In addition to producing bikes under its own name, Falcon produces bicycles under a joined brand with Puma AG.

Biomega bicycles are represented in the design collections of both MOMA, SFMOMA and the Sir Terrence Conran Foundation Collection.

History
Biomega was established in 1998 by former university classmates Jens Martin Skibsted and Elias Grove Nielsen.

Technology
Biomega makes both shaft-driven bicycles and bamboo bicycles.

References

External links
 Official website Link does not work?
 Copenhagen. Life. Cycle. by Biomega m short film/advert directed by Mikael Colville-Andersen

Cycle manufacturers of Denmark
Manufacturing companies of Denmark
Manufacturing companies based in Copenhagen
Vehicle manufacturing companies established in 1998
Danish brands
Companies based in Copenhagen
Danish companies established in 1998
Design companies established in 1998